Orthopic may refer to:

 Orthoptic (geometry), the set of points for which two tangents of a given curve meet at a right angle, a type of isoptic
 Orthoptics, the diagnosis and treatment of defective eye movement and coordination
 A form of eye exercise designed to correct vision

See also
Orthotopic